Cambarus batchi, the bluegrass crayfish, is a species of crayfish in the family Cambaridae. It is endemic to Kentucky, known as the "Bluegrass State" which lead to the common name.

The IUCN conservation status of Cambarus batchi is "LC", least concern, with no immediate threat to the species' survival. The IUCN status was reviewed in 2010.

References

Further reading

 
 
 

Cambaridae
Articles created by Qbugbot
Crustaceans described in 1973
Freshwater crustaceans of North America
Endemic fauna of Kentucky